The Prussian G 5.5's were early German freight locomotives with a compound engine. Unlike the otherwise identical G 5.4 they had a leading Adams axle instead of a Krauss-Helmholtz bogie. The delivery of the G 5.5 in 1910 followed directly on from that of the G 5.4. A total of either 20 or 25 G 5.5 were built. 

The Deutsche Reichsbahn took over several of these locomotives as nos. 54 1076-1092, other sources list them as nos. 54 1080-1082 and 1085-1092. In the Second World War several more G 5.5's were reclaimed by the Reichsbahn from Poland, nos. 54 1121, 1141, 1157 and 1185, other sources cite 54 1183, 1217 and 1218.

Other railways also procured this class:
 Grand Duchy of Mecklenburg Friedrich-Franz Railway: Nine locomotives, classed as G 5.4, see Mecklenburg G 5.4.
 Imperial Railways in Alsace-Lorraine: Three locomotives from 1912, see Alsace-Lorraine G 5.5.

See also 
Prussian state railways
List of Prussian locomotives and railbuses

References 

 This article was created from a translation of the equivalent German language article

2-6-0 locomotives
G 05.5
Railway locomotives introduced in 1910
Standard gauge locomotives of Germany
1′C n2v locomotives
Freight locomotives